The X class is a class of diesel locomotives built by English Electric for the Tasmanian Government Railways between 1950 and 1952. They were the first class of diesel locomotive to enter mainline service on a Government-owned railway in Australia.

Description

The power generating unit consists of an English Electric 6SRKT Mark I engine, developing  at 750 revs. per minute. The engine is turbocharged and has vertical cylinders of  bore and stroke. The main generator is coupled directly to the engine crankshaft and the auxiliary generator is mounted on the free end of the main generator.

To house the power unit and auxiliary equipment, the superstructure is divided into four compartments separated from each other by sealed bulkheads. At the front end is the cab containing separate controls for running in either direction, with instrument panels arranged for right hand drive in each case. Adjacent to the cab is the compartment which houses the main equipment frame and the generator, supplies both generators with filtered air and prevents oily vapour from the engine compartment passing into the generators.

The filters are carried in the body side and the bulkhead between the generator and the engine compartment is so arranged that the discharge from the generator passes directly into the engine room. For ease of access to the engine room a set of hinged, removable aluminium doors is provided on each side and to prevent overheating, each of these doors is louvred. On the roof over the engine are two hinged doors which facilitate access to or removal of the cylinder heads. Air for combustion in the engine is led directly to the turbo-charger through a duct from a filter in the side panelling.

The fuel and water tanks are housed in the back end of the engine room,  being carried in the fuel storage tank,  in the fuel service tank and 20 gallons in the water header tank.

The radiator compartment at the back end houses the equipment for cooling the water and lubricating oil, the traction motor blower and the exhauster and compressor sets for the train and engine brakes.

Louvres are provided in the doors and panel sides to maintain a supply of air to the T.M. blower and to cool the exhauster.

To enable the power unit and the main equipment frame to be lifted clear of the locomotive, a removable roof section is provided over both these items. The roof panel over the tanks is also detachable.

Provision is made for carrying storage batteries in boxes on the platform alongside the generator compartment. The batteries are for starting, control and lights.
The welded superstructure framework is built up of angles and channels and the whole is welded down to form an integral part of the main frame. The frame itself is a welded structure formed of  channels, suitably braced by channel and plate cross members. The main ventilating duct to the traction motors is incorporated in the centre sill of the structure and the upper plates form the floor of the superstructure, carry the main equipment and is arranged to prevent oil getting on to the power cables underneath.

Shunters footsteps are provided at the back end and bars can be attached at the jacking up pads for lifting the complete locomotive.

The superstructure complete with the main frame, rests on two four wheel bogies of the swing bolster design, each bogie being fitted with two English Electric traction motors. The frames are of  steel plate, the main centre stretcher, the swing bolster and the headstocks being fabricated units of steel plate and channels. SKF roller bearings are provided. Manganese steel liners without lubrication are fitted to the axle-boxes and guides and also to the bogie centre pivots. Renewable cast iron liners are provided on the bolster, for transmitting the traction drive to the superstructure. Wheels are of the S.C.O.A.-P pattern. The bogies have clasp brakes, acting on all wheels, actuated on each side of each bogie by a separate cylinder through equalised brake rigging which has anti-friction bushes of Mintex brand in the pin holes.

The locomotive brakes are operated by straight air equipment of Westinghouse manufacture. The application of the vacuum brake on the train makes an automatic application of the air brake on the locomotive via a proportional valve. A handbrake is fitted for parking purposes and operates on one side only of the front bogie.

The engine controls, dead man's cut out gear, warning horn and sanders are air operated, electric pneumatic sanding valves being fitted to select automatically forward or backward sanding.

Tonum "E" type head lights ( diameter) are fitted at both ends together with tail and marker lights and ample internal lighting points are installed in the different compartments, while the instrument panels have internal diffused lighting.

A Teloc speed indicator and recorder is installed and is driven by telescopic and flexible shafts from the front axle end through the axlebox cover.

Two bucket type seats are provided for the enginemen and window wipers arc fitted for both directions of travel. Normal running is cab first.

History

In 1946, the Tasmanian Government Railways put out a request for tender for the construction of five to ten diesel-electric locomotives, which was successfully awarded to English Electric. Following a review of the tender in 1948, it was decided to order a second batch of ten, and finally a third batch of twelve in 1949.

Introduction
Delivered by English Electric between September 1950 and December 1952, the first 20 were manufactured by the Vulcan Foundry under contract to English Electric, and the remaining 12 at Dick Kerr works. The first two units entered service on the Tasmanian mainline railways on 13 September 1950.

The X Class was the first locomotive design in Australia to have a multi-unit capacity, with the possibility of operating up to three locomotives, all controlled from the leading locomotive.

No members of the class were named after entering service, however X16 carried a commemorative Festival of Britain plate after it was displayed at that exhibition in 1951.

In service

Primarily built with components designed for branch line and shunting services, the X class proved very successful on main line heavy goods duties. Their light axle loading made it possible for them to work on a wide variety of lines, and for many years after their introduction the X class were the dominant freight-hauler on Tasmanian railways. They were also used on passenger trains.

Starting in April 1954 and working until July 1978, the Tasman Limited, Tasmania's premier passenger train, was hauled primarily by the X class. From 1960 they were often used in multiple on the train, and when Tasmania's passenger trains were ceased on 28 July 1978; X20, X16, X29 and X17 hauled the last Tasman Limited from Hobart to Wynyard. This was the last regular passenger service to operate in Tasmania.

In March 1978 the X class were included in the transfer of the Tasmanian Government Railways to Australian National. With the new transfer of twenty 830 class locomotives from South Australia and later purchase of ZB class and ZC class locomotives from Queensland Rail, the X class began to be withdrawn. 

The first was withdrawn in October 1980. Units were withdrawn as they became due for major overhauls. With new locomotives in the fleet, and the change from vacuum-braked to air-braked rolling stock, X10 and X18 were the last in mainline service, often hauling the "Paper Train" to Australian Newsprint Mills' Boyer plant. Although remaining in a very serviceable condition, the last X classes were made redundant in 1988 with the cessation of vacuum braked services.

Seven locomotives from the class have been preserved. Many have seen continued service on Tasmanian railways as special passenger trains, but at the present time there is no activity because of the state government suspension of heritage rail on active lines.

XA Class
During the introduction of the more powerful, albeit slower Y class in 1961, it was found that X class engines were susceptible to overheating when working in multiple with Y classes on slow, heavy trains. This was due to the X class having only one stage of field weakening compared to two in the Y class. Coupled with the difference in gearing, this resulted in the X class loading up excessively at lower speeds. As a result, five had their generators and control equipment modified between 1961 and 1970 to give two stages of field weakening and were reclassified as the XA class.

As well as addressing overheating issues, the modifications allow the engines to work better on the grades on the southern region of the Main Line.

General modifications
Side ladders and roof handrails were added to all units from 1956 while new automatic couplers and retractable buffers were fitted to most units during the early 1970s. Several units also had sliding windows installed later in life as a result of complaints from engine crews that the original winding windows were draughty and leaked in wet weather.

In addition, some units were constructed with eight sandboxes whilst normally each had four. X16 would also lack roof handrails over the cab area until fairly late, and XA class member had a metal bar welded underneath the cab windows across the full width of the cab. The reasons for these modification remain unclear, but are most likely to have been specially built for testing or experimental purposes.

Livery

Upon their initial construction and delivery, all units of this class were painted Brunswick green; however, this colour tended to blend into the Tasmanian countryside, resulting in several accidents at level crossings. To enhance visibility, some units of the class had broad cream bands or an orange chevron painted on the ends.

From the mid 1950s, all units were painted into TGR's new red and cream livery. In 1970 a red, black and yellow tiger stripes livery was introduced.

After control of Tasmanian rail lines was passed to Australian National in March 1978, most units retained their old yellow livery, but with ANR signwriting. Four were repainted into Australian National's green and yellow livery.

Status table

See also 
 Former Tasmanian Government Railways locomotives
 Locomotives of the Tasmanian Government Railways/1950

References

Bo-Bo locomotives
English Electric locomotives
Diesel locomotives of Tasmania
Railway locomotives introduced in 1950
Diesel-electric locomotives of Australia
Vulcan Foundry locomotives